Tubeway Army is the debut album by Tubeway Army, released in 1978. Its initial limited-edition run of 5,000 (known unofficially as the Blue Album due to its coloured vinyl and cover) sold out but did not chart. When reissued in mid-1979, following the success of the follow-up Replicas (1979), the more commonly known cover art featuring a stylised portrait of Gary Numan was introduced. This release made No. 14 in the UK album charts.

Overview
Despite being the band's debut, Tubeway Army was seen as a transitional record, linking the punk flavour of early singles "That's Too Bad" and "Bombers" with the electronic music and science fiction imagery of Replicas. The first track, "Listen to the Sirens", borrowed its opening line from the Philip K. Dick novel Flow My Tears, The Policeman Said, while "Steel and You" contained references to androids ("Just my steel friend and me / I stand brave by his side"). These and a number of other tracks featured primitive synthesizer effects, the legacy of Numan chancing upon a Minimoog in the recording studio one day.

Elsewhere, the album's lyrics generally inhabited a seedy world that was compared to William Burroughs, an author whose influence Numan acknowledged. "Friends" concerned male prostitution. "Every Day I Die" was about teenage masturbation. "Jo the Waiter" referenced drug addiction. "The Life Machine" was told from the perspective of a comatose man on life support who can only "watch from somewhere as the loved ones come and go".

Sonically, the album ranged from hard rock with punk overtones, such as "My Shadow in Vain", "Friends" and "Are You Real?", through the post-punk of "Listen to the Sirens" and "The Dream Police", to the predominantly acoustic "Every Day I Die" and "Jo the Waiter".

Major influences cited for this album's overall sound included David Bowie (both 'Ziggy' and 'Berlin' eras), early Roxy Music and Brian Eno, Lou Reed and The Velvet Underground, and early Ultravox.

Numan has regularly performed tracks from this album since his early solo career, including "My Shadow in Vain", "Something's in the House", "Every Day I Die" and "The Dream Police". Others that later appeared in his live repertoire included "Listen to the Sirens", "Friends" and "Jo the Waiter".

Live at the Roxy
The 1998 CD reissue of Tubeway Army included a live concert, originally a bootleg called Live at the Roxy, retitled as Living Ornaments '78 – a retrospective reference to Numan's official live albums Living Ornaments '79 (1981), '80 (1981) and '81 (1998). It included early versions of "My Shadow in Vain" and "Friends" ("Do Your Best") as well as a cover of The Velvet Underground's "White Light/White Heat".

Cover versions
Crust punk/death metal band Deviated Instinct covered "Listen to the Sirens" on their 1990 EP Nailed.
The 1997 Numan tribute album Random featured covers of Tubeway Army songs by Pop Will Eat Itself ("Friends"), The Orb ("Jo the Waiter") and Dubstar ("Every Day I Die"). 
Terre Thaemlitz recorded a piano version of "Friends", released in 1999 on the Numan tribute album Replicas Rubato.
Stoner Metal band Red Fang covered "Listen to the Sirens" in 2018 and released it as a single and a music video.

Track listing
All songs written by Gary Numan, except "White Light/White Heat" (Lou Reed).

"Listen to the Sirens" – 3:06
"My Shadow in Vain" – 2:59
"The Life Machine" – 2:45
"Friends" – 2:30
"Something's in the House" – 4:14
"Everyday I Die" – 2:24
"Steel and You" – 4:44
"My Love Is a Liquid" – 3:33
"Are You Real?" – 3:25
"The Dream Police" – 3:38
"Jo the Waiter" – 2:41
"Zero Bars (Mr. Smith)" – 3:12
CD bonus tracks

"Positive Thinking" (live) – 2:56
"Boys" (live) – 2:13
"Blue Eyes" (live) – 2:03
"You Don't Know Me" (live) – 2:28
"My Shadow in Vain" (live) – 4:13
"Me My Head" (live) – 4:10
"That's Too Bad" (live) – 3:26
"Basic J" (live) – 3:03
"Do Your Best" (live) – 2:40
"Oh! Didn't I Say" (live) – 2:31
"I'm a Poseur" (live) – 2:30
"White Light/White Heat" (live) – 2:49
"Kill St. Joy" (live) – 3:46

Personnel
Tubeway Army
Gary Numan – guitars, lead vocals, keyboards
Paul Gardiner – bass guitar, backing vocals
Jess Lidyard – drums
Technical
Gary Numan – producer
Mike Kemp – engineer, mixer
John Dent – digital remastering

Notes

numanme.co.uk

References
1998 CD reissue liner notes

Tubeway Army albums
1978 debut albums
Beggars Banquet Records albums